The Mikado Block, also known as the Mikado Building, is an historic building in Portland, Oregon. The 1880 structure is part of the Portland Yamhill Historic District, which is listed on the National Register of Historic Places.  The first floor, which has been heavily remodeled, was originally occupied by an Olds & King department store.

References

External links
 

1880 establishments in Oregon
Buildings and structures in Portland, Oregon
Commercial buildings completed in 1880
Commercial buildings in Oregon
Historic district contributing properties in Oregon
Italianate architecture in Oregon
Southwest Portland, Oregon